The Conference League Four-Team Championship was an annual motorcycle speedway contest between teams competing in the tird tier of speedway in the United Kingdom (the Conference League) held from 2003 until 2008. Eight teams consisting of four riders from each team are placed in two qualifying groups, and one rider from each team competed in each race. The winners and second place of each group competed for the Championship in the final.

In 2011, it was replaced by the  National Development League Fours.

Winners

See also
 List of United Kingdom Speedway Fours Champions
 Speedway in the United Kingdom

References

Speedway competitions in the United Kingdom